Greta C. Holtz is an American career diplomat. She served Chargé d'Affaires of the U.S. Embassy in Doha, Qatar between June 14, 2020 to June 16, 2022.

Career 
Holtz earned a Bachelor of Science in political science from Vanderbilt University, a Master of Arts in international relations from the University of Kentucky’s Patterson School of Diplomacy and International Commerce, and a Master of Science in national security studies from the National War College.

Ambassador Holtz was the State Department coordinator for the Organization for Security and Cooperation in Europe (2004–2006) and director of the Middle East Partnership Initiative at the State Department from 2006 to 2007.

Holtz was the minister-counselor for provincial affairs at the U.S. Embassy in Baghdad from 2009 to 2010 and was the deputy assistant secretary of state for public diplomacy and strategic communication in the Bureau of Near Eastern Affairs from 2010 to 2012, and served as ambassador to Oman from September 2012 to December 2015.

Ambassador Holtz was the vice chancellor and acting chancellor of National Defense University's College of International Security Affairs from 2016 to 2017.
Ambassador Holtz was the principal deputy assistant secretary of state for South and Central Asian Affairs, from 2019 to 2020  and served as the senior foreign policy advisor to the Commander of U.S. Special Operations Command (SOCOM), from 2017 to 2018.

Holtz speaks Arabic, French and Turkish.

References

External links

Greta C. Holtz Ambassador-Designate to the Sultanate of Oman Senate Committee on Foreign Relations July 18, 2012

Living people
Year of birth missing (living people)
Ambassadors of the United States to Oman
Ambassadors of the United States to Qatar
American women ambassadors
National War College alumni
United States Foreign Service personnel
University of Kentucky alumni
Vanderbilt University alumni